Shadow Lawn is a historic home located at Lincolnton, Lincoln County, North Carolina.  It was built in 1826, and is a two-story, five-bay by two-bay, Federal-style brick mansion.  It has a gable roof, is set on a full basement, and features three exterior end chimneys.  It was the home of Congressman Charles R. Jonas (1904–1988), who purchased the property in 1935.

It was listed on the National Register of Historic Places in 1972. It is located in the West Main Street Historic District.

References

Houses on the National Register of Historic Places in North Carolina
Federal architecture in North Carolina
Houses completed in 1826
Houses in Lincoln County, North Carolina
National Register of Historic Places in Lincoln County, North Carolina
1826 establishments in North Carolina
Historic district contributing properties in North Carolina